Saint Seraphim of Sarov Church is a Russian Orthodox church in Turnaevo of Novosibirsk Oblast, Russia.

History
The construction of the church began in 1912.

It was consecrated on September 14, 1914.

External links
 Сибирские Кижи: возрожденное сокровище. История села Турнаево и Серафимо-Турнаевского храма. Образование и православие. 
 Архив официального сайта московского патриархата. 

Churches in Novosibirsk Oblast
Churches completed in 1914
Cultural heritage monuments of regional significance in Novosibirsk Oblast
Russian Orthodox church buildings in Russia